Sahar Baassiri (also spelled Baasiri) is currently Ambassador, Permanent Representative of Lebanon to UNESCO in Paris. Prior to her move into diplomacy she was a trailblazing Lebanese journalist. 

Ms. Baassiri worked for the leading Lebanese daily An-Nahar newspaper between 1981 and 2009. In 1993, she became the first female foreign editor at a Lebanese daily newspapers. And was the first woman in the Arab world to write a front-page column in a daily paper.  She was also the United Press International (UPI), Beirut correspondent between 1989 and 1991.

She is the author of two books (in Arabic): Lebanon on Hold  and The Wandering Arabs  both published in 2009 by Dar An-Nahar. Ms. Baassiri earned her BA in Political Science from the American University of Beirut and an MS in Journalism from Columbia University Graduate School of Journalism.

References

Lebanese expatriates in the United States
Lebanese women journalists
Lebanese journalists
Date of birth missing (living people)
Living people
American University of Beirut alumni
Columbia University Graduate School of Journalism alumni
Year of birth missing (living people)
21st-century Lebanese women writers
21st-century Lebanese writers